Shri Jagannath Medical College and Hospital (SJMCH, Puri) is a Government medical college in Puri, Odisha, where students may earn the Bachelor of Medicine and Bachelor of Surgery (MBBS) degree. Admission is based on merit using the National Eligibility and Entrance Test. Yearly undergraduate student intake is 100 with the first students arriving in 2021. SJMCH at Puri was built at a cost of around 300 crores on an area of 33 acres, and it is the eighth government medical college in the state.

The college is located at the Samangara area of Puri city, approximately 7 km from Jagannath Temple, Puri and 28 km from Konark Sun Temple. It is recognised by the Medical Council of India.

History
The Government of Odisha approved the proposal of the establishment of Medical college at Puri and it was named as Sri Jagannath Medical College. But the medical college establishment missed the 2019 deadline and the first classes began in 2021.

Courses offered
The college offers the degree Bachelor of Medicine and Bachelor of Surgery under Utkal University with an annual intake of 100. It is recognised by the Medical Council of India.

References

Medical colleges in Odisha
Universities and colleges in Odisha
Educational institutions established in 2017
2017 establishments in Odisha